Titilagarh is a town and Municipality in Balangir district in the Indian state of Odisha.

Geography and Climate
It has an average elevation of 215 metres (705 feet).

Demographics
 India census, Titilagarh had a population of 27,756. Males constitute 52% of the population and females 48%. Titilagarh has an average literacy rate of 67%, higher than the national average of 59.5%: male literacy is 75%, and female literacy is 57%. In Titilagarh, 12% of the population is under 6 years of age.

Transport
Titilagarh Junction railway station is a junction on the Jharsuguda - Vizianagaram line and Raipur - Vizianagaram line. Through this it is connected to all major cities of India. It was one of the major railway stations in the Sambalpur Railway Division under East Coast Railway Zone.

Titilagarh is near to NH-59 (previously known as NH-217), which runs between Gopalpur in Odisha and Raipur in Chhattisgarh. There is a state highway between Titilagarh and Balangir district via Saintala and between Titilagarh to Bhawanipatana via Sindhekela.

Notable people

 Uday Chand Agarwal - IAS, Ex-Secretary, Dept. of Personnel, Ex, Chief Vigilance Commissioner, Government of India.
Sam Pitroda - Padma Bhushan awardee, Telecom engineer, inventor and entrepreneur.
Asit Tripathy - IAS, Chief Secretary, Govt of Odisha.
 Jitendra Mishra - Film maker.
Om Prakash Agarwal - IAS, served in World Bank (USA).
Capt. Chandrahas Behera - Indian Army Corps of EME.
Justice Balkrishna Behera - Judge, High Court (Odisha).
Dr. Balkishan Agarwal - Medical Specialist, Edinburgh (UK).
Ritesh Agarwal - CEO of OYO Rooms.
Humane Sagar - Playback Singer.
Saswat Joshi - Internationally acclaimed Odissi dancer.

References

External links
 Bolangir District Website
 S Odisha Government Website
 Odisha Tourism
 Titilagarh Municipality Website

Cities and towns in Bolangir district
Balangir district